Theodore C. "Ted" Speliotis (born August 20, 1953) is a Democratic member of the Massachusetts House of Representatives, representing the 13th Essex District. He lives in Danvers, Massachusetts.

Representative Speliotis attended the Carroll School in Peabody, the Danversport Elementary School, and graduated from Danvers High School in 1971. In 1976, he earned his bachelor's degree in political science and a certification and license to teach from Northeastern University.

Speliotis represented the 12th Essex District from 1979 to 1987. He lost the 1986 Democratic primary to Peabody City Councilor Thomas Walsh.

From 1987 to 1995, Speliotis was the Danvers Town Moderator.

He returned to the House in 1997 following the retirement of Sally Kerans. He did not seek re-election in 2020 and his seat was again taken by Kerans.

See also
 2019–2020 Massachusetts legislature

References

External links

|-

Democratic Party members of the Massachusetts House of Representatives
Northeastern University alumni
People from Danvers, Massachusetts
1953 births
Living people
Politicians from Salem, Massachusetts
21st-century American politicians